GAI or Gibberellic-Acid Insensitive is a gene in Arabidopsis thaliana which is involved in regulation of plant growth. GAI represses the pathway of gibberellin-sensitive plant growth. It does this by way of its conserved DELLA motif.

References

Further reading

External links 
 PubMed Search

Transcription factors
Signal transduction
Arabidopsis thaliana genes
Gene expression